Galya-tető  is the third highest mountain in Hungary and in the Mátra mountain range (after Kékes and Pezső-kő). It is a major tourist attraction. Altitude: 964 m. The area officially belongs to Mátraszentimre, Heves county. It is a "holiday village". Permanent residents: 45 people.

External links
Pictures

Mountains of Hungary
Mountains of the Western Carpathians